Joseph Dolce (born October 13, 1947) (originally ) is an American singer/songwriter, poet and essayist.

Dolce achieved international recognition with his multi-million-selling song, "Shaddap You Face", released worldwide under the name of his one-man show, Joe Dolce Music Theatre, in 1980–1981. The single reached number one in 15 countries. It has sold more than 450,000 copies in Australia and continues to be the most successful Australian-produced single worldwide, selling an estimated six million copies. It reached No. 1 on the Australian Kent Music Report Singles Chart for eight weeks from November 1980.

Life and career

1947–1977: Early years
Dolce was born in 1947, the eldest of three children, to Italian-American parents in Painesville, Ohio, graduating from Thomas W. Harvey High School in 1965. During his senior year, he played the lead role of Mascarille in Molière's Les Précieuses Ridicules for a production staged by the French Club of Lake Erie College, which was his first time on stage, acting and singing an impromptu song he created from the script. The play was well-received and his performance was noted by director Jake Rufli, who later invited him to be part of his production of Jean Anouilh's Eurydice.

His co-star in Les Précieuses Ridicules was a sophomore on a creative writing scholarship at Lake Erie College, Carol Dunlop, who introduced him to folk music, poetry and the writings of William Faulkner and Ernest Hemingway. Dunlop later married the Argentine novelist Julio Cortázar. Dolce attended Ohio University, majoring in architecture, from 1965 to 1967 before deciding to become a professional musician.

While attending college at Ohio University, in Athens, Ohio, he formed various bands including Headstone Circus, with Jonathan Edwards who subsequently went on as a solo artist to have a charting hit song in the US ("Sunshine"). Edwards subsequently recorded five Dolce songs including, "Athens County", "Rollin' Along", "King of Hearts", "The Ballad of Upsy Daisy" and "My Home Ain't in the Hall of Fame", the latter song becoming an alt country classic, also recorded by Robert Earl Keen, Rosalie Sorrels, JD Crowe & the New South and many others.

1978–1984: Move to Australia, "Boat People" and "Shaddap You Face"
Dolce relocated to Melbourne, Australia, in 1978 and his first single there was "Boat People"—a protest song on the poor treatment of Vietnamese refugees—which was translated into Vietnamese and donated to the fledgling Vietnamese community starting to form in Melbourne. His one-man show, Joe Dolce Music Theatre, was performed in cabarets and pubs with various line-ups, including his longtime partner, Lin Van Hek.

In July 1980, he recorded the self-penned "Shaddap You Face", for the Full Moon Records label, at Mike Brady's new studios in West Melbourne. When in Ohio, Dolce would sometimes visit his Italian grandparents and extended family—they used the phrases "What's the matter, you?" and "Eh, shaddap", which Dolce adapted and used in the song. He wrote the song about Italians living in Australia and first performed it at Marijuana House, Brunswick Street, Fitzroy in 1979. It became a multi-million-selling hit, peaking at No. 1 on the Australian Kent Music Report Singles Chart for eight weeks from November 1980, in the UK from February 1981 for three weeks, and also No. 1 in Germany, France, Fiji, Puerto Rico, the Canadian province of Quebec, Austria, New Zealand and Switzerland. Dolce received the Advance Australia Award in 1981. The song has had hundreds of cover versions over the decades including releases by artists as diverse as Lou Monte, Sheila (France), Andrew Sachs (Manuel, of Fawlty Towers), actor Samuel L. Jackson and hip-hop legend KRS-One. In 2018, the first Russian language version was released by two of Moscow's most popular singers, Kristina Orbakaite and Philipp Kirkorov. The song has been translated into fifteen languages, including an aboriginal dialect.

By February 1981, it had become Australia's best-selling single ever selling 290,000 copies, entering the Guinness Book of World Records and surpassing the previous record of 260,000 copies by Brady's own "Up There Cazaly".

"Shaddap You Face" has continued to be licensed and recorded by other artists and companies since its release in 1980 with its most recent appearance, in 2021, as part of the US series The Morning Show (aka, Morning Wars in Australia.)

Follow up single, "If You Wanna Be Happy" was released in 1981 and charted in Australia and New Zealand. In December 1981, Dolce released the album Christmas in Australia, which peaked at number 92 on the Australian chart.

1984–present
With Lin Van Hek, he formed various performance groups including Skin the Wig, La Somnambule (1984) and the ongoing Difficult Women (1993). Van Hek and Dolce co-wrote "Intimacy", for the soundtrack of the 1984 film The Terminator, now part of the US Library of Congress collection. He was a featured lead actor in the Australian film Blowing Hot and Cold (1988). He has continued to perform solo and with Van Hek as part of their music-literary cabaret Difficult Women.

In 2010, two of his photos were selected for publication in the US journal, Tupelo Quarterly.

Since 2009, he has been a prolifically published poet in Australia. In 2010, he won the 25th Launceston Poetry Cup at the Tasmanian Poetry Festival. His poems were selected for Best Australian Poems 2014 & 2015. He was the winner of the 2017 University of Canberra Vice-Chancellor's Health Poetry Prize, for a choral libretto, longlisted in the same year for the University of Canberra Vice-Chancellor's Poetry Prize and included in the Irises anthology. He longlisted for the 2018 University of Canberra Vice-Chancellor's Poetry Prize and was included in the Silence anthology. He was Highly Commended for the 2020 ACU Poetry Prize and included in the Generosity anthology. He was selected as the August 2020 City of Melbourne Poet Laureate.

Since 2018, he has been the television and film reviews editor for Quadrant magazine.

Poetry
Collections

Discography

Albums

Singles

References

External links

Joe Dolce Countdown biography

1947 births
Living people
21st-century Australian poets
American expatriates in Australia
American male guitarists
American male singer-songwriters
American people of Italian descent
Australian guitarists
Australian male guitarists
Australian male poets
Australian singer-songwriters
Australian singers of Italian descent
Guitarists from Ohio
Meanjin people
Musicians from Melbourne
Ohio University alumni
People from Painesville, Ohio
Quadrant (magazine) people
Singer-songwriters from Ohio
21st-century Australian male writers
20th-century American guitarists
20th-century American male musicians
MCA Records artists
PolyGram artists
Australian male singer-songwriters